Prisons in Ukraine are regulated by the State Penitentiary Service of Ukraine, a part of the Ministry of Justice of Ukraine. 

There are 32 preliminary prisons, 131 penitentiary establishments for adults and 8 colonies for minor criminals in Ukraine. According to Amnesty International, torture and ill-treatment by the police is widespread in Ukrainian prisons. Several police officers have been arrested for allegedly torturing detainees.

Prison population
In early 2010, there were over 147,000 people in prison and more than 38,000 in pre-trial detention facilities in Ukraine, a total three times that of Western European countries, and half as much as in the United States. In 2009, the number of inmates in Ukraine rose for the first time in seven years. Coupled with this increase was a higher instance of suicide (44 prisoners) and HIV (761 deaths therefrom) in penal institutions during 2009; the former compares with 40 suicides in 2008. Between 1996 and 2001, about 26 percent of inmates in various prisons across Ukraine tested HIV-positive. In a January 2006 study, between 15 and 30 percent of prisoners tested HIV-positive. In early 2005, tests showed up to 95 percent of prisoners were hepatitis C positive. In 2011, 6,000 inmates had HIV and 5,500 suffered from an active form of tuberculosis.

Various inmates have been kept in pre-trial detention for up to 12 years; there is no legal limit as to length of such incarceration.

Conditions
Convicts in Ukrainian prisons work 7 or 8 hours a day, except for weekends. Prisoners get to keep part of the money raised from the sale of the items they produce. They are limited to four pairs of shoes. Computers, cell phones and other electronic gadgets are strictly forbidden in jail. Bathing may be limited to once a week.

According to the US Department of State Human Rights Report 2009, conditions in prisons and detention facilities in Ukraine are harsh, and pretrial detention was seen as arbitrary and lengthy. According to Amnesty International, allegations of torture and ill treatment in police custody increased in 2010.

See also
Lukyanivska Prison
Ukraine prison ministry
Incarceration in Ukraine

References

External links
Web-site of Dmytro Yagunov
 State Penitentiary Service of Ukraine

Prison population
 
Imprisonment and detention
 

Web-site of Attorney Dmytro Yagunov